Bobri is a novel by Slovenian author Janez Jalen. It was first published in 1942–3.

See also
List of Slovenian novels

Slovenian novels
1942 novels